Sahodaran Ayyappan Road, popularly known as S.A Road is one of the most important and the second main arterial road of CBD Kochi city (after the M.G Road); it is supposed to be the busiest and most congested road   in the city of Kochi, which run in east-west direction and the shortest road connecting the two main iconic junctions in the city. The road connects the MG Road in west with Vyttila Junction & Hub in east and continues further as Tripunithura Road that connects to Tripunithura, hence termed as the back bone road of Kochi.

S.A.Road along with M.G.Road are the two main arterial CBD roads connected with the  Kochi Metro Rail and moving straight to Vytilla Hub (biggest transport hub and junction in State of Kerala), where three modes of transport  (rail, water and road)converge & diverge, hence making it one of the most expensive and affluent areas in the city and State of Kerala.

Kochi's high-end housing colonies are all branched out from this arterial road like Panampilly Nagar, Giri Nagar, Gandhi Nagar, Jawahar Nagar etc, it is a commercial high street with Hospitals, Banks & 5 star classified Luxury Hotels (Olive Downtown, Radisson Blu, etc.), enhancing the road's importance is its easy access to the city downtown railway station (Ernakulam Junction Railway Station-Biggest & Central Railway station at Kochi).

Greater Cochin Development Authority (GCDA) & Rajiv Gandhi International Indoor Stadium are located along this road at Kadavanthra.
It is a four lane city road with median separating the two carriageways.  The road is one of the oldest road of the city and covers a distance of 3.2 KM. The road is named after famous social reformer, Sahodaran Ayyappan.

History
S.A. Road was earlier known as Tripunithura Road that was built by Kochi Royal Maramattu (PWD) Department in year 1863 when the capital of Kochi Kingdom was shifted to Tripunithura.  The road was constructed to facilitate the King's annual procession to Ernakulam for attending the Annual Durbar at the Durbar Hall. The original road terminated at Chitoor Road near Valanjambalam from where it connect to Durbar Hall Grounds. Later it was extended to MG Road, when the Britishers constructed in year 1926. A connecting road from MG Road to Foreshore road was built when the latter was opened in the year 1988. In 1962 the stretch from Foreshore Road to Vyttila was renamed as S.A Road as this part came under Corporation of Cochin whereas the remaining stretch went to Thrippunithura Municipality.

The original road was just a single lane as there was no cars other than those belonging to Royal family. In year 1936, the road was relaid into 2 lane traffic, which remains even today. As the city grew, many commercial establishments started in this stretch which increased the traffic. Moreover, with opening of Panampally Nagar, Giri Nagar, Kadavanthra residential areas along with growth of Vyttila Junction made the road terribly congested heavy traffic. With less availability of land on both sides, land acquisition became extremely difficult.

In year 2000, the Corporation of Cochin decided to go ahead with forcible land acquisitions, thereby the stretch from South Overbridge to Vyttila was able to relay into 4 lane road with some areas still under construction.

Educational Institutions
Traum Academy for German & French languages

Major Junctions/Landmarks
 Vyttila Junction, from where SA Road starts in the east. Vyttila Junction is the largest junction in Kerala, built in 1997 by National Highways Authority of India (NHAI) as part of the NH 47 bypass road.
 Janatha Junction
 Elamkulam Bridge built over picturesque Chilavanoor Lake, one of the important riverfront area.
 Elamkulam Junction
 Kadavanthra Junction, one of the busiest and most important junction in city of Kochi. It is one of the emerging commercial highstreet with several leading retail stores and many luxury 5 star classified hotels operating like the Olive Downtown, Radisson Blu etc. The Kaloor-Kadvanthara road starts from this junction, which is the shortest route to Kaloor. The GCDA headquarters and the statue of Sahodharan Ayyappan are located here. Entrances to posh residential areas like Panampilly Nagar, Giri Nagar, GCDA Nagar starts from here. A secondary junction called Kochukadavanthara, Rajiv Gandhi International Indoor sports complex, "Central bank of India" in Kallelil building and other prominent banks are also situated here.
 Manorama Junction, the major junction before South Railway Overbridge connects to major residential belt Panampally Nagar. The Manorama Newspaper office located here contributed name to this junction.
 South Overbridge, was the first railway overbridge in the city. The overbridge was built by Southern Railways without enough planning, resulting in executing poorly designed bridge, causing much of traffic bottleneck and terrible congestion. However it is one of the main entry into CBD.
 Pallimukku, is the last major junction and is part of Kochi CBD where the MG Road passes through. The Medical Trust Hospital at the Pallimukku is the major landmark.

References

External links

Roads in Kochi